Allison Williams may refer to:

Allison Williams (actress) (born 1988), American actress
Allison Williams (reporter) (born 1984), The Daily Wire reporter
Allison Williams (Miss West Virginia) (born c. 1981), 2003 pageant titleholder
Allison Williams (footballer), Saint Kitts and Nevis footballer

See also
 Alyson Williams (born 1962), American R&B singer
 William Allison (disambiguation)